is a Japanese professional footballer who plays as a centre back for Vissel Kobe.

References

External links

1996 births
Living people
Japanese footballers
Association football defenders
Vissel Kobe players
Renofa Yamaguchi FC players
J1 League players
J2 League players